Movile may refer to:
 Movile, a village in the commune Iacobeni, Sibiu County, Romania
 Movile Cave in Constanța County, Romania
 Movile (company)